Zee Alwan is an Indian Arab cable satellite television channel owned and operated by Zee Entertainment Enterprises, a media and entertainment company based in Dubai, United Arab Emirates. It majorly airs programmes in Arabic and other regional languages of the Arab world. The channel is also available in other Arab countries in the Middle East, as well as many countries in Europe, Africa and North America. A part of the Zee Entertainment Enterprises, it started to broadcast on 10 October 2012 as the first Arabic language cable & satellite channel in the Arab world.

Zee Alwan marks the first time that some of India's most popular television serials are brought to the Middle East in Arabic. The move builds on the growing popularity of Bollywood in the Arab world as well as the strong and historic cultural links between the Arab world and India, with Indian family serials set to appeal to Arab audiences.

Zee Alwan is known for its diverse programming, which not only includes dubbed Indian serials but also popular shows on cookery, health and fitness, and travel features, among others, Bollywood films and shows subtitled in Arabic, American shows subtitled in Arabic, English shows subtitled in Arabic, Turkish movies and series, Croatian series, and Serbian series dubbed in Arabic. A number of Arabic serials and shows, produced and set in the Arab world, are also aired.

Social media 

Due to Zee Music and Zee TV both having over 50 million subscribers, Zee Alwan has 3.16 million subscribers on its YouTube channel. Unlike Zee Music, Zee Alwan is not one of the most popular YouTube channels, but it still amasses a large amount of subscribers.

Programming
 Bacha Party Kids Party (subtitled in Arabic)
 Dance India Dance (subtitled in Arabic)
 The Great Indian Rasoi (subtitled in Arabic)
 Snack Attack (subtitled in Arabic)
 Khana Khazana (subtitled in Arabic)
 Yoga for Life (subtitled in Arabic)
 Yoga for Life with Kurt Johnson (subtitled in Arabic)
 Peggy K's Kitchen Cures (subtitled in Arabic)
 Nirmala's Spice World (subtitled in Arabic)
 The Incurables (subtitled in Arabic)
 BrainCafé (subtitled in Arabic)
 Science With BrainCafé (subtitled in Arabic)
 Jeena Isi Ka Naam Hai (subtitled in Arabic)
 Yoga For You (subtitled in Arabic)
 Pilates (subtitled in Arabic)
 Pilates from the Inside Out (subtitled in Arabic)
 Rock Your Yoga (subtitled in Arabic)
 سهرة مع نجوم بوليوود (subtitled in Arabic)
 Full Circle (subtitled in Arabic)
 Under the Sun (subtitled in Arabic)
 Under the Sun with Nathan LeRoy (subtitled in Arabic)
 The Genesis of Healing (subtitled in Arabic)

References

Zee Entertainment Enterprises
Television stations in the United Arab Emirates
Mass media in Dubai
Television channels and stations established in 2012